The 2022 I.ČLTK Prague Open was a tournament played on outdoor clay. It was the 29th edition for men and 17th for women, which were respectively part of the 2022 ATP Challenger Tour and the 2022 ITF Women's World Tennis Tour. It took place in Prague, Czech Republic between 2 and 8 May 2022.

Men's singles main draw entrants

Seeds

 1 Rankings are as of 25 April 2022.

Other entrants
The following players received wildcards into the singles main draw:
  Jonáš Forejtek
  Martin Krumich
  Andrew Paulson

The following player received entry into the singles main draw using a protected ranking:
  Sebastian Ofner

The following player received entry into the singles main draw as a special exempt:
  Evan Furness

The following player received entry into the singles main draw as an alternate:
  Illya Marchenko

The following players received entry from the qualifying draw:
  Matteo Donati
  Lucas Gerch
  Daniel Michalski
  Yshai Oliel
  Lukáš Rosol
  Clément Tabur

The following players received entry as lucky losers:
  Max Purcell
  Kaichi Uchida

Women's singles main draw entrants

Seeds

 1 Rankings are as of 25 April 2022.

Other entrants
The following players received wildcards into the singles main draw:
  Lucie Havlíčková
  Miriam Kolodziejová
  Daria Lopatetska
  Barbora Palicová

The following player received entry using a protected ranking:
  Priscilla Hon

The following player received entry as a special exempt:
  Nikola Bartůňková

The following players received entry from the qualifying draw:
  Anastasia Dețiuc
  Nagi Hanatani
  Linda Klimovičová
  Aneta Laboutková
  Luisa Meyer auf der Heide
  Andreea Prisăcariu
  Dominika Šalková
  Natalija Stevanović

The following player received entry as a lucky loser:
  Ana Sofía Sánchez

Champions

Men's singles

  Pedro Cachín def.  Lorenzo Giustino 6–3, 7–6(7–4).

Men's doubles

  Nuno Borges /  Francisco Cabral def.  Andrew Paulson /  Adam Pavlásek 6–4, 6–7(3–7), [10–5].

Women's singles

  Maja Chwalińska def.  Ekaterine Gorgodze, 7–5, 6–3

Women's doubles

  Bárbara Gatica /  Rebeca Pereira def.  Miriam Kolodziejová /  Jesika Malečková, 6–4, 6–2

References

External links
 2022 I.ČLTK Prague Open at ITFtennis.com
 2022 I.ČLTK Prague Open at ATPtour.com
 Official website

2022 ATP Challenger Tour
2022 ITF Women's World Tennis Tour
2022 in Czech sport
May 2022 sports events in the Czech Republic
I.ČLTK Prague Open